Patos Island (Duck Island) is a small uninhabited island in the northwestern Gulf of Paria. The island is a part of the Dependencias Federales (Federal Dependencies) of Venezuela.

Geography

History
Patos Island was part of the former British colony of Trinidad and Tobago. On 26 February 1942,  the island became part of Venezuela in exchange for Soldado Rock to Trinidad and Tobago and was put under the administration of the Ministerio del Interior y de Justicia (Ministry of Interior and Justice) as part of the Dependencias Federales.

See also 
Federal Dependencies of Venezuela
List of marine molluscs of Venezuela
List of Poriferans of Venezuela

References

External links
 About Patos Island
 Map of the Dependencias Federales with location of Patos Island
 Map of Patos Island
 Picture of Patos Island

Gulf of Paria
Uninhabited islands of Venezuela
Federal Dependencies of Venezuela